Ouaka is one of the 16 prefectures of the Central African Republic.  It borders the Democratic Republic of the Congo, covers an area of 49,900 km2, and has a population of 224,076 (2003 census), giving a population density of under 5 inhabitants/km2. The capital is Bambari.

Towns and villages

Adodo
Afrotcho
Agbandjo
Aguéné
Angbaka
Angora
Angoua
Awatchie
Azouyomba
Babadja
Bada
Badjia
Bagaya
Bagou
Bahamo
Bakala
Bakala Koupi
Bakoro
Balepou
Baleyo
Baligo
Bambari (capital)
Banga
Banganendji
Bangba
Banguéré
Banindji
Baréamba
Batibla
Batobadja
Beidou
Belingo
Bianga
Bimbala
Bindi
Binguinendji
Bisibanda
Bologondjo
Bohola
Bothco
Bouassi
Bougwa
Boulou
Dakadjia
Dalio
Damangou
Dambagoua
Dami
Dangé
Digui
Djama
Djoubissi
Dokoua
Domanga 
Douloungoa
Doumba
Doungba 
Dourou 
Gambala 
Ganamandji
Gaoda
Gbadala
Gibada
Gibanda 
Gimodo 
Gotchélé 
Grapou 
Grengakola
Grimari 
Goboudo
Gouhoutou 
Goulinga 
Gousoumalé 
Guémé 
Igoua 
Ippy 
Kabadou
Kedja
Kerela
Kidjigra
Kodjo
Kohiri 
Komali
Komblé 
Kongbanga 
Kongolobadja
Kopia
Koropo 
Kotanguisa
Kouango 
Koudoukou 
Koumbanga
Koumourou
Kouzouhindji 
Kradé 
Lekpa
Lioto 
Makoulou
Malikara 
Matchika
Mbahouba
Mbaranga
Mbaya
Méné
Modokouzou
Modomali-Mbrés
Mono 
Moroubas
Ndioloussou
Ndoro 
Ngadza 
Ngahondji 
Ngouyali 
Ouamba
Oubou 
Pangakora 
Papa 
Pierlot 
Sakoua
Samblé
Séko 
Siou
Tagbara 
Tawangé 
Tianbi 
Tougoumalé
Tongouyassi
Toumba
Vevré
Vilao
Wali-Boykota
Wandalongo
Yabita
Yamindou
Yangao 
Yangoumaka 
Yangasa
Yassibazanga 
Yéraoua 
Youbandji
Zamahou

References 

 
Prefectures of the Central African Republic